Roi-des-Belges ("King of the Belgians") or tulip phaeton was a car body style used on luxury motor vehicles in the early 1900s. It was a double phaeton with exaggerated bulges "suggestive of a tulip". The rear bulges accommodated two corner seats like tub armchairs which were accessed from the rear by a central door with a small fold-down seat.

The Roi-des-Belges style began with a 1901 40 hp Panhard et Levassor with a Rothschild body commissioned by Leopold II of Belgium, Roi des Belges.  The style was suggested by the celebrity dancer, Cléo de Mérode, 
who was famously purported to be Leopold's mistress.

The style and the name Roi-des-Belges were used on many makes of the time, including Mototri Contal, Packard, Rolls-Royce Silver Ghost, Spyker, and Renault and by other coachwork builders.

References

External links
 Roi-des-Belges body, 1907, unrestored. Note form of access to rear seat

Car body styles
Carriages